Jajpur is a Vidhan Sabha constituency of Jajpur district, Odisha.

Areas in this constituency includes Jajpur, 16 GPs (Basudevpur, Beruda, Bhubaneswarpur, Bhuinpur, Bichitrapur, Chainipur, Jahanpur, Khairabad, Mala Anandapur, Markandapur, Nathasahi, Panasa, Maheswarpur, Shyamadaspur, Similia and Upparbaruhan) of Jajpur block and 16 GPs (Susua, Duduranta, Kanikapada, Mangalpur, Akarapada, Champeipal, Chhachina, Chittalo, Dasrathpur, Gopalpur, Kasapa, Katikata, Khandara, Mallikapur, Taliha and Tarpada) of Dasarathpur block.

Elected members

Sixteen elections held during 1951 to 2019. Elected members from the Jajpur constituency are:
2019: (52): Pranab Prakash Das (BJD)
2014: (52): Pranab Prakash Das (BJD)
2009: (52): Pranab Prakash Das (BJD)
2004: (25): Parameswar Sethi (BJD) 
2000: (25): Suryamani Jena (BJD) 
1995: (25): Suryamani Jena (Janata Dal) 
1990: (25): Jagannath Mallick (Janata Dal) 
1985: (25): Jagannath Mallick (Janata Party)
1980: (25): Niranjan Jena (Congress-I)
1977: (25): Jagannath Mallick(Janata Party)
1974: (25): Jagannath Lallick (Utkal Congress)
1971: (26/ 27): Prafulla Chandra Ghadei (Orissa Jana Congress) and Jagannath Mallik (Utkal Congress)
1967: (26/ 27): Prafulla Chandra Ghadei (Orissa Jana Congress) and Santanu Kumar Das (Orissa Jana Congress)
1961: (118/ 119): Madan Mohan Patnaik (Congress) and Santanu Kumar Das (Congress)
1957: (84): Gadadhar Dutt (Congress) and Santanu Kumar Das (Congress)
1951: (62): Gadahar Dutta (Congress) and Santanu Kumar Das (Congress)

2019 Election Result
In the 2019 election, Biju Janata Dal candidate Pranab Prakash Das defeated Bharatiya Janata Party candidate Goutam Ray by 40,656 votes.

2014 Election Result
In the 2014 election, Biju Janata Dal candidate Pranab Prakash Das defeated Indian National Congress candidate Santosh Kumar Nanda by huge margin of 84,613 votes.

2009 Election Result
In the 2009 election, Biju Janata Dal candidate Pranab Prakash Das defeated Indian National Congress candidate Debabrata Kantha by 30,245 votes.

Notes

References

Assembly constituencies of Odisha
Jajpur district